Harry Reynolds (April 4, 1901 – December 22, 1971) was an American film editor.

He edited London After Midnight (1927), The Unknown (1927) with Errol Taggart, West of Zanzibar (1928), Where East Is East (1929), Fallen Angel (1945), Charlie Chan in City in Darkness (1939), Mr. Moto in Danger Island (1939, where he also worked as the cutter, Killer at Large (1947), and Ben-Hur (1925) with Lloyd Nosler, Basil Wrangell, William Holmes and Ben Lewis.

He also edited Too Many Winners (1947), Killer at Large (1947) with Alfred DeGaetano, and Gas House Kids (1946).

Filmography

References

Bibliography

External links
 

1901 births
1971 deaths
American film editors
American television editors